Abdullahpur is a union territory of Char Fasson Upazila in Bhola district in Bangladesh.

Area
The area of Abdullahpur Union is 7,865 acres.

Administrative Structure
Abubakarpur Union is a union of Char Fasson Upazila. Administrative activities of this union are under Char Fassion police Station. It is part of Bhola-4 constituency 118 of the National Assembly.

Population Data
According to the 2011 census, the total population of Abubakarpur Union is 18,562. Of these, 9,053 are males and 9,509 are females. The total number of families is 3,975.

Education
According to the 2011 census, Abubakarpur Union has an average literacy rate of 43.9%.

See also
 Unions of Bangladesh
 Abubakarpur Union
 Char Madras Union

References

Unions of Char Fasson Upazila
Unions of Bhola District
Char Fasson Upazila